Pavillon may refer to:

 Le Pavillon Hotel, New Orleans
 Le Pavillon (New York City restaurant), a former New York City restaurant
 Pavillon de Flore, a section of the Palais du Louvre in Paris, France
 Pavillon de Paris, a large concert space in Paris, France
 Pavillon de l'Arsenal, a center for urban planning and museum in Paris, France
 Pavillon de la Jeunesse, an indoor arena in Quebec City, Quebec
 Pavillon des sports Modibo Keita, an indoor sporting arena in Bamako, Mali
 Le Pavillon-Sainte-Julie, a commune in the Aube department in north-central France
 Pavillon de l’Horloge, a structure by architect Jacques Lemercier

People with the surname
 Étienne Pavillon, French lawyer and poet
 Nicolas Pavillon, French bishop of Alet and Jansenist

See also
 Pavilion (disambiguation)